Xianping Subdistrict  is a subdistrict under the jurisdiction of Tongxu County, Henan Province, People's Republic of China. , it administers the following 18 residential communities:
Diyi (First) Community
Di'er (Second) Community
Disan (Third) Community
Disi (Fourth) Community
Diwu (Fifth) Community
Xiawa Community
Zhaohe Community
Jinyuan Community
Miaogang Community
Xinggang Community
Dongshuiwo Community
Maozhuang Community
Liuzhuang Community
Wulibu Community
Gaozhai Community
Yicun Community
Ercun Community
Daizhuang Community

See also
List of township-level divisions of Henan

References

Township-level divisions of Henan
Tongxu County